This is a list of the largest metropolitan areas in Spain by population.

Estimates are from the following sources:  
 the "Functional Urban Areas" (FUAs) of the Study on Urban Functions of the European Spatial Planning Observation Network (ESPON, 2007) 
 the "Larger Urban Zone" (LUZs) of Urban Audit project (2004), supported by the European Union. Not all cities were included in this survey.  
 calculations by Francisco Ruiz from data of the Instituto Nacional de Estadística (2008 estimates). As well as "metropolitan area" data, Ruiz has produced larger conurbation data for some areas. The "conurbation" figure is used where available, and is cited as such; otherwise, the "metropolitan area" figure is used.

The figures differ between the reports due to the difference in survey dates and differences in methodology. For example, ESPON considers Oviedo–Gijón–Avilés as a single FUA, while Urban Audit has separate LUZs for Oviedo and Gijón. Similarly, Vilanova i la Geltrú is included in Barcelona metropolitan area by ESPON, but as a separate conurbation by Ruiz.

See also
Demographics of Spain
List of cities (municipalities) of Spain
List of metropolitan areas in Europe
List of urban areas of the European Union

References

External links
 Largest Cities in Europe

 
Spain metropolitan areas
Spain
Metropolitan areas